Spyker Cars is a Dutch sports car marque held by the holding company Spyker N.V. (formerly known as Spyker Cars N.V. and Swedish Automobile N.V.). The modern Spyker Cars held the legal rights to the brand name. The company's motto is "Nulla tenaci invia est via", Latin for "For the tenacious, no road is impassable". The marque's logo displays an aircraft propeller superimposed over a spoked wheel, a reference to the historic Spyker company that manufactured automobiles and aircraft. In 2010, the company acquired Swedish car manufacturer Saab Automobile from General Motors.

In September 2011, Spyker announced the impending sale of its supercar division to Greenwich, Connecticut based North Street Capital,

In an attempt to save Spyker from bankruptcy, Swedish Automobile in September 2011, announced the immediate sale of Spyker to American private equity and hedge fund North Street Capital for €32 million (US$41 million), and subsequently changed its name to Swedish Automobile N.V. However, it was later revealed that the transaction did not occur.

On December 18, 2014, Spyker confirmed that it had gone bankrupt, hoping to restructure its finances and getting back on its feet. The bankruptcy declaration was reverted early 2015 and the company announced to continue with the production of sports cars. In 2021 it went bankrupt again. In January 2022 Spyker announced a return to building cars after being backed by Russian investors.

History

The reborn company was founded by Victor Muller and Maarten de Bruijn in 1999, and since 2000, Spyker has been building exclusive sports cars like the C8 Spyder and the C8 Laviolette (with its elegant glass roof). Spyker's history of producing aero engines is reflected in details in these new cars as well as in the logo. Before building the C8, de Bruijn had been building small numbers of the Spyker Silvestris, which in many ways foreshadows Spyker's later cars.

On July 14, 2005, it was announced that the C8 was approved for sale on the United States market.

Between 2002 and 2006, Spyker built the C8 Double 12 S, which was available from the factory with 5 different levels of performance called Stage I (400 h.p.) through Stage V (620 h.p.), depending on the customer's need for performance.

Between 2003 and 2007, Spyker built the C8 Spyder T, with the Twin turbo system being developed in conjunction with Cosworth in England. These engines were capable of 525 h.p. and 0–60 mph acceleration times of 4.0 seconds.

In 2005, the head designer and founder, Maarten de Bruijn, left the company, and founded Silvestris Aquamotive which builds aluminum space frame speed boats.

In 2006, Spyker built the C12 La Turbie with an V12 engine capable of 500 horsepower and acceleration from 0–60 mph in less than 4 seconds.

In September 2006, Spyker bought out the Midland F1 team. The team competed in the final 3 races of the 2006 season as Spyker MF1. In the 2007, the team competed as Spyker F1 using engines supplied by Ferrari. Driver Adrian Sutil was paired with Christijan Albers until the European Grand Prix where the latter was replaced by reserve driver Markus Winkelhock; the team then signed Sakon Yamamoto to fill in the slot for the rest of the year. The team itself had minimal success, suffering from multiple retirements (including double retirements in Malaysia, Canada and Brazil) before Sutil scored the team's first and only point in Japan. At the end of the season, the team was sold to a consortium named "Orange India" led by Vijay Mallya and was subsequently renamed as Force India.

On May 27, 2004, Spyker Cars listed on the Euronext Amsterdam Stock Exchange at €15.50, falling to a low of €8.28 in April 2005. The stock rebounded sharply in early 2006 to over €22 per share. Early in 2007 the stock showed a sharp decline to levels beneath €13 because of financing issues. As a result, several stock issues were announced to big investors. Notably, all shares have been sold at higher prices than the market price at the moment of announcement. On November 13, 2005, Spyker Cars and Mubadala Development Company, a principal investment company wholly owned by the government of the United Arab Emirates, announced their strategic alliance, with Mubadala acquiring 17% of Spyker. Mubadala has a strong relationship with sports cars, also controlling 5% of Ferrari.

In 2007, Spyker, in collaboration with the Italian car-design firm Zagato, produced the C12 Zagato, based on the C12 La Turbie, but with more appealing body work, faster speeds, and the Zagato trademark roof bubbles. This is perhaps the more exclusive Spyker car to date.

In November 2009, Spyker announced that it would be moving production from Zeewolde to Whitley, Coventry, where assembly would be done in partnership with CPP Manufacturing. UK production began in February 2010. Due to the bankruptcy of SAAB and a falling out with business partners, the production was not moved to the UK.

Ownership of Saab Automobile
On 26 January 2010, General Motors (GM) confirmed that Spyker and GM had come to an agreement allowing Spyker to purchase Saab Automobile, subject to regulatory and government approval; the sale was completed on February 23, 2010. General Motors would continue to supply Saab with engines, transmissions and also completed vehicles in the shape of the new Saab 9-4X from GM's Mexican factory. The deal included a loan from the European Investment Bank, guaranteed by the Swedish government. It consisted of 74 million US dollars in cash up front, payable to GM by July 2010, and shares in Spyker estimated to be worth about 320 million US dollars.

On February 23, 2010, Spyker Cars closed the deal to buy Saab Automobile from General Motors. Spyker and Saab operated under the parent company Swedish Automobile, named Spyker Cars N.V.

Saab Automobile quickly ran out of money and Spyker was unable to fund the losses. The companies stopped paying their bills in early 2011. On March 30, 2011, production was halted at Saab Automobile, due to suppliers refusing to deliver without payment.

Spyker CEO Victor Muller made several attempts at acquiring funding. A joint venture with Chinese company Hawtai was announced on May 3, 2011, only to fall apart a week later. Shortly afterwards joint ventures with Chinese car maker Youngman, and Chinese car-dealership chain Pang Da were announced. Negotiations ended with Spyker attempting to sell all of the shares in Saab Automobile to the Chinese companies on October 28, 2011, for 100 million euros. This transaction did not have the approval of former Saab-owner General Motors, who refused to supply technological licenses to Youngman and Pang Da. The proposed deal fell apart. Spyker CEO Victor Muller applied for the bankruptcy of Saab Automobile on December 19, 2011.

On 16 April 2012, a meeting on Saab's bankruptcy was held at the District Court of Vänersborg. The official receivers in charge of the Saab liquidation valued the assets at US$500m and the debt at US$2,000m. After subtracting the value of the assets, Saab left a debt of US$1,500m.

Proposed sales and eventual sale of Saab
In February 2011, it was announced that Swedish Automobile, the Dutch owner of Saab Automobile, agreed to sell its sports-car unit to Vladimir Antonov. Antonov, a former Spyker chairman and shareholder, was expected to pay 15 million euros (US$21 million) for the company. However, in March 2011, the deal fell through, with Spyker's manufacturing partner CPP Manufacturing placing a bid, but this deal fell through later that month.

In September 2011, it was announced that Swedish Automobile would sell Spyker Cars, in an all-cash offer to an American private equity and hedge fund North Street Capital, for €32 million (US$41 million). In January 2012, Swedish Automobile again offered Spyker cars up for sale, but this sale did not actually occur.

Acquisition and bankruptcy of Saab Automobile

Upon the failure of an expected deal by Koenigsegg Group AB to purchase Saab Automobile from General Motors late in November 2009, Spyker Cars began talks with GM to take over Saab. However, with a stated deadline of the end of 2009 for completion of the sale, it was announced on December 18 that GM and Spyker, after carrying out an extensive due diligence effort, had determined that a satisfactory deal was not possible and GM would begin the process of a staged wind-down of Saab Automobile.

Spyker Cars shortly thereafter made another offer that is said to solve all the problems that GM pointed at. GM had until December 21 to respond,  but the deadline was later extended to December 23 and then indefinitely.  As negotiations continued with GM, another rival bidder for Saab Automobile emerged - Luxembourg-based investment firm Genii Capital backed by F1 mogul Bernie Ecclestone. However, following weeks of negotiations, it was announced by Genii on January 23, 2010, that Spyker was on the brink of coming to an agreement. This was also confirmed by Spyker CEO Victor Muller who said GM and Spyker were meeting in Stockholm to approve the deal.

Muller closed the deal against expectations to buy Swedish automaker Saab from General Motors on January 26, 2010, in a deal worth US$400 million. Following the deal the company Spyker Cars N.V. was later renamed to Swedish Automobile N.V.

The delays in the takeover were attributed to an investigation by the Swedish monetary agency Riksgälden and the Swedish security police Säpo, where the agencies found connections between the family of major shareholder Vladimir Antonov and organized crime, as well as involvement in money laundering. Säpo reported their findings to the United States Federal Bureau of Investigation, and shortly thereafter GM dropped further talks about the deal, until a company controlled by Victor Muller called Tenaci purchased Antonov's share in the company. Antonov also announced that $US25 million has been given to Spyker as a loan to purchase Saab Automobile from GM. He confirmed that the loan will be provided by Convers Bank, a bank owned by the Antonovs, and that GM was fully aware of that. Antonov cannot invest in Spyker until 2016, when GM's preference share holding ends. Another way he could enter earlier would be permission by GM. Antonov stated, "I'm not involved in crime and I've initiated an investigation as to why GM thinks I am."

On 26 January, GM confirmed that Spyker and GM had come to an agreement allowing Spyker to purchase Saab, subject to regulatory and government approval; the sale was completed on February 23, 2010. GM will continue to supply Saab with engines, transmissions and also completed vehicles in the shape of the new Saab 9-4x from GM's Mexican factory. The deal includes a loan from the European Investment Bank, guaranteed by the Swedish government. It comprises US$74m in cash up front, payable to GM by July 2010, and shares in Spyker to the tune of US$320m.

On February 23, 2010, Spyker Cars closed the deal to buy Saab Automobile from GM. Spyker and Saab operate under the parent company Swedish Automobile, named Spyker Cars N.V.

On June 8, Saab Automobile  said it had stopped production due to an insufficient supply of parts. This occurred only two weeks after resuming production following a seven-week hiatus. The supply of parts stopped because Saab did not pay its suppliers. Production was due to start again on August 9.

The company changed its name to Swedish Automobile N.V. on June 15, 2011 after receiving approval at its annual shareholder meeting.

On June 23, Saab announced that it was unable to pay June salaries to the entire workforce of 3,800 due to lack of funding. The trade union IF Metall gave Saab seven days to pay the salaries to their employees; otherwise, IF Metall threatened to force a liquidation of the company. On June 29, Saab employees were paid.

On October 28, 2011, it was reported that the Chinese car maker Youngman Ltd., and the Chinese automotive retailer Pang Da Automobile Trade Co. had agreed a joint €100-million (US$140 million) takeover of Saab Automobile, and its UK dealer network unit from Swedish Automobile, with Youngman and Pang Da taking 60 and 40 percent stakes respectively.

Saab's restructuring process was granted, and the plan was that in 2014 the company would have had a positive equity. The restructuring process would have removed 500 employees from Saab, saving about €100,000.00, according to the restructuring plan. GM rejected the deal with Youngman and Pang Da on November 7, 2011, although unsuccessful discussion to convince GM continued for a month.

On December 19, 2011, chairman Victor Muller was forced to file Saab Automobile for bankruptcy following the failed buyout by a Chinese consortium, which was blocked by former parent GM to prevent technology transfer.

On 16 April 2012, a meeting on Saab's bankruptcy was held at the District Court of Vänersborg. The official receivers in charge of the Saab liquidation valued the assets at US$500m and the debt at US$2,000m. After subtracting the value of the assets, Saab leaves a debt of US$1,500m.

Saab was eventually sold in June 2012 to a Chinese-Swedish investment group called National Electric Vehicle Sweden (NEVS).

In August 2012, CEO Muller, Spyker cars, stated that Spyker Cars will sue GM over Saab bankruptcy. Muller, stated, "Ever since we were forced to file for Saab Automobile's bankruptcy in December of last year, we have worked relentlessly on the preparation for this lawsuit which seeks to compensate Spyker and Saab for the massive damages we have incurred as a result of GM's unlawful actions".

Joint ventures with Youngman
In August 2012, Spyker announced that Youngman Ltd. acquired a 29.9% stake in its parent company Spyker N.V. for €10 million (US$12.5 million). The Spyker P2P B.V. will focus on the development of a new luxury sports utility vehicle, with ownership split 75:25 between Youngman and Spyker, respectively.Spyker Phoenix (2012–present)Spyker Cars (1999–present) The Spyker Phoenix B.V. will focus on the development of a range of premium cars based on Saab's PhoeniX platform, with ownership split 80:20 between Youngman and Spyker, respectively.

Spyker after Saab
In March 2013, the B6 Venator was unveiled at the Geneva Motor Show, the B6 Venator was noted as Spyker's first concept car in nearly four years.

In June 2013 the claim of Spyker Cars was heard in Detroit before a US federal judge. The judge dismissed the claim of 3 billion dollars by Spyker Cars. According to Judge Gershwin Drain "General Motors had a contractual right to approve or disapprove the proposed transaction", and "The court is going to grant the motion to dismiss the matter". and that Spyker had agreed in a deal with GM, when it bought Saab, to give GM the right to control a change of ownership . Spyker Cars NV appealed the ruling. The appeal was heard at the 6th U.S. Circuit Court of Appeals in Cincinnati. The court said on Friday October 24, 2014 that GM did not intentionally interfere with the Dutch company's effort to sell Saab to Zhejiang Youngman Lotus Automobile Co, leading to Saab's bankruptcy. Judge Eugene Siler said GM's actions were not malicious, and that it had "legitimate business concerns" about the sale, including who would benefit from Saab's use of its technology. Siler said that Spyker's claim was "fatally flawed".

On September 16, 2013, Spyker N.V. lost its listing on Euronext Amsterdam after failing to undergo a restructuring agreement.

On November 5, 2014, the Dutch Court "Midden Nederland" ordered Spyker to leave, within seven days, the factory they rented and to pay 152.000 euro in overdue rent. The claim was made by Jacques Walch, the owner of the factory rented by Spyker. Despite this, CEO Victor Muller insisted the company would be able to pay its bills "in a matter of days."

On 2 December 2014 Spyker NV was granted a moratorium of payment (financial restructuring) by the Dutch court "Midden Nederland". Spyker needed protection from creditors for its liquidity problems. Victor R. Muller, Spyker founder and chief executive, said "Over the past few years, Spyker has faced a number of serious difficulties and challenges resulting from, among others, the legacy of the F1 era and the acquisition of Saab Automobile AB,".

On 18 December 2014 Spyker NV was declared bankrupt by the Dutch court "Midden Nederland". Victor R. Muller, Spyker's founder and chief executive, said "In 2000 our objective was to found a global sports car manufacturer, and we did just that. During this time we deployed several challenging activities. These have affected the company, and contributed to our decline,".  Spyker appealed the bankruptcy declaration, and on 29 January 2015, the court reversed the declaration. This meant that Spyker NV was protected from creditors, while solving its financial difficulties. This allowed Muller to pursue plans to merge Spyker with an unnamed "US based manufacturer of high performance electric aircraft." This proposed merger partner was eventually discovered to be a company called Volta Volare. On May 13 of that year, Spyker NV closed a deal with the creditors. Spyker owed 44 million euro and agreed to pay 12.000 euro per creditor. The curator of Saab GB was the largest creditor; it claimed 24,9 million euro. Saab GB agreed to receive a payment of 61.000 euro. A following attempt by the Latvian bank Lizings to claim more money, was declined by the court.

On July 29, 2015, Spyker exited moratorium of payment (restructuring), and resumed business operations. In March 2016, Spyker announced the production of a new model, the C8 Preliator, at the Geneva Motor Show.

In January 2021, Spyker filed for bankruptcy again.

Models

Produced

Spyker C8

The C8 Spyder was the original base model with an Audi 4.2 litre V8 engine. Since the start of its production in 2000, twelve different variants have been sold. A long wheelbase version was presented at the 2008 Geneva Motor Show, called the C8 Aileron. A year later, a convertible version was presented. Horsepower ranges from 400 for the original C8 Spyder to 620 for the C8 Double 12S.

The most recent model, the C8 Preliator, was officially announced at the 2016 Geneva Motor Show. Only 50 vehicles will be produced. The car has a 4.2l supercharged Audi V8 producing 525 hp, resulting in a 0–100 km/h time of 3.7 seconds and a top speed of 322 km/h. The car either comes with a 6 speed manual Getrag or a 6 speed ZF automatic transmission. As with previous Spyker models, the car has typical aviation inspired design elements such as NACA styled air-inlets. Driver technology has been upgraded as well compared to previous models, with the C8 Preliator gaining a heads-up display and bluetooth connectivity for phones.

Spyker C12

The Spyker C12 is a luxury sports car of which there were two variants. Spyker originally planned a small production run, but only one prototype of each car was built.
 Spyker C12 La Turbie, 2006
 Spyker C12 Zagato, 2007

Planned but not produced

Spyker D12/D8

In 2006, the Spyker D12 Peking-to-Paris high-performance SUV, was announced at the Geneva Motor Show. Its name was then changed to the D8.
Spyker hoped that the assistance of Saab, which they owned at the time, would help the D8 reach production. According to Muller in April 2011, the D8 should have started production in early 2013, with a price tag of £186,000. However, in March 2013, production was scheduled for 2016, with a production prototype due by 2014. Eventually, plans to produce the model were discontinued.

Spyker E8/E12
Spyker shareholders and CEO, Victor Muller hinted at a Maserati Quattroporte, Porsche Panamera rival with an eight-cylinder (the E8) or a twelve-cylinder (the E12) engine but due to problems getting the D8 into production, the idea was ignored until 2009 when Muller has said he "believes now could be the time to resurrect the saloon." Muller believed it would take about four years from the time that the E8/E12 is revealed to actual production. It was never produced however.

Sales 
Spyker's all-time high was achieved in 2006, with 94 cars sold, about 290 cars were sold between 2000 and 2010.

Voluntary financial restructuring of the company
Spyker filed a voluntary petition on December 2, 2014, for financial restructuring in an effort to address certain short-term operational and liquidity challenges. The company stated that the District Court of Midden-Nederland in Lelystad, the Netherlands (the "Court") granted Spyker's voluntary petition for temporary moratorium of payment ("surseance van betaling"), the Dutch equivalent of the American Chapter 11 proceedings, and has appointed an administrator who, together with the Board of Management, bears final responsibility for management of the company as long as the moratorium of payment status is in force. The Court's ruling to grant a temporary moratorium of payment protects the company from its creditors throughout the duration of the moratorium. The company's wholly owned subsidiary Spyker Events & Branding B.V. entered temporary moratorium of payment a month ago.

Results
Spyker has lost money each year since 2007. This table summarizes the key figures of Spyker Cars from 2007 to 2012. The figures originate from the Spyker Annual Report in 2011 and 2012.

Motorsport

Spyker F1

On September 9, 2006, Spyker bought Midland F1 Racing, a Formula One team from Canadian businessman Alex Shnaider. Spyker paid US$106.6 million for the team which was renamed Spyker MF1 Team for the last three races of the 2006 Formula One season. As part of the deal, the cars had a revised livery for the final three races of 2006.

On August 14, 2007, Spyker Cars announced that it would have to sell all or part of the team due to a potential split of the team from its parent company.

On September 3, 2007, Indian billionaire Dr Vijay Mallya (Chairman and CEO of Toyota sponsors Kingfisher Airlines) and Dutch entrepreneur Michiel Mol (Spyker's Formula One Director), stated the Spyker board had accepted their offer and became the new owners of the Spyker Formula One team, which was renamed as Force India Formula One Team for the 2008 season.

Spyker Squadron

The Spyker Squadron is the factory racing team, competing in events such as the 24 Hours of Le Mans, the Le Mans Series, occasional entries in the FIA GT Championship, and the 12 hours of Sebring. Spyker also supplies a car to Swiss Spyker distributor, Speedy Garages, running under the name Speedy Racing Team.

References

External links

 Spyker Cars' official website
 Spyker N.V. 

 
Car manufacturers of the Netherlands
Sports car manufacturers
Vehicle manufacturing companies established in 1999
Vehicle manufacturing companies disestablished in 2021
Zeewolde
Car brands
Dutch racecar constructors
Dutch companies established in 1999